Herbinder Singh “Yogi” Johl (born 3 January 1970) is a Canadian wrestler. He competed in the men's Greco-Roman 130 kg at the 1996 Summer Olympics. Yogi was the first Canadian of the Sikh religion and of Punjabi-Canadian descent to represent Canada at the Olympic games.

References

External links
 

1970 births
Living people
Canadian male sport wrestlers
Olympic wrestlers of Canada
Wrestlers at the 1996 Summer Olympics
Sportspeople from Vancouver